Verkhnekalinovsky is a rural locality (a settlement) and the administrative center of Verkhnekalinovsky Selsoviet, Kamyzyaksky District, Astrakhan Oblast, Russia. The population was 1,331 as of 2010. There are 11 streets.

Geography 
Verkhnekalinovsky is located 14 km south of Kamyzyak (the district's administrative centre) by road. Zhan-Aul is the nearest rural locality.

References 

Rural localities in Kamyzyaksky District